John Byron Nelson Jr. (February 4, 1912 – September 26, 2006) was an American professional golfer between 1935 and 1946, widely considered one of the greatest golfers of all time.

Nelson and two other legendary champions of the time, Ben Hogan and Sam Snead, were born within seven months of each other in 1912.  Although he won many tournaments in the course of his relatively brief career, he is mostly remembered today for having won 11 consecutive tournaments and 18 total tournaments in 1945. He retired officially at the age of 34 to be a rancher, later becoming a commentator and lending his name to the Byron Nelson Classic, the first PGA Tour event to be named for a professional golfer. As a former Masters champion he continued to play in that annual tournament, placing in the top-10 six times between 1947 and 1955 and as high as 15th in 1965.

In 1974, Nelson received the Bob Jones Award, the highest honor given by the United States Golf Association in recognition of distinguished sportsmanship in golf, and was inducted into the World Golf Hall of Fame. He became the second recipient of the PGA Tour Lifetime Achievement Award in 1997. He received the 1994 Old Tom Morris Award from the Golf Course Superintendents Association of America, GCSAA's highest honor. Nelson was posthumously awarded the Congressional Gold Medal in 2006.

Early life
Born near Waxahachie, Texas, Byron Nelson was the son of Madge Allen Nelson (1893-1992) and John Byron Nelson Sr. (1889-1965). His parents set a precedent for him not only in their long lives — Madge Nelson lived to age 98, and her husband to age 77 — but also in their religious commitment. Madge, who had grown up Baptist, was baptized in the Church of Christ at age 18, and John Byron Sr., raised Presbyterian, was baptized in the Church of Christ soon after meeting Madge. The senior Byron Nelson went on to serve as an elder in the Roanoke Church of Christ, and the younger Byron Nelson was a committed member of that congregation, even performing janitorial services there from time to time long after he became famous. He placed his membership at the Hilltop Church of Christ in Roanoke from 1989 until 2000, when he moved his membership to the Richland Hills Church of Christ in North Richland Hills, Texas.

When Nelson was 11 years old, the family moved to Fort Worth, where he barely survived typhoid fever after losing nearly half his body weight to the disease, which also left him unable to sire children. Soon after his baptism at age 12, he started caddying at Glen Garden Country Club. On his caddying days, Nelson said, "I knew nothing about caddying at first, but it wasn't difficult to learn. The other caddies, though, didn't like to see any new ones, because that might mean they wouldn't get a job sometime." An article on Nelson in Sports Illustrated noted that initially caddies were not permitted to play at the club: "[H]e would often practice in the dark, putting his white handkerchief over the hole so he could find it in the darkness." The club later changed its policy and sponsored a caddie tournament, where a 14-year-old Nelson beat fellow caddie and future golf great Ben Hogan by a single stroke after a nine-hole playoff. Nelson and Hogan were rivals but close friends in their teen years, and for the first part of their professional careers as well, but Nelson's early success was difficult for the struggling Hogan to deal with, and they gradually grew apart, while retaining mutual respect.

In 1934, Nelson was working as a golf pro in Texarkana, Arkansas, when he met future wife Louise Shofner, to whom he was married for 50 years, before she died in 1985 after two severe strokes.

Professional career

Championship heyday
After turning professional in 1932, Nelson served as a club professional in Texas, and played as many significant tournaments as he could afford, to develop his game. Money was tight, as Texas was hit very hard by the Great Depression. A pair of top-three finishes in important Texas events encouraged him. He then took a club professional's job at the Ridgewood Country Club in New Jersey in 1935. He worked hard on his game, having earlier realized that with the technological change from hickory to steel shafts, which was gathering momentum in the early 1930s, that the golf swing would have to adapt as well. Nelson was among the first of a new generation of players who developed a full swing with increased leg drive leading the downswing; this is the forerunner of modern golf technique as practiced by top players, right to the present day. Nelson is sometimes credited as being the father of the modern golf swing. He refined the changes for a couple of years, and then took his game to the highest level of competition, the PGA Tour. Nelson's first significant victory was in 1935 at the New Jersey State Open. He followed this up with a win at the Metropolitan Open the following year. He reportedly won this tournament with "$5 in my pocket".

In 1937, Nelson was hired as the head professional at the Reading Country Club in Reading, Pennsylvania, and worked there until 1940, when he took a new job as head pro at the Inverness Club in Toledo, Ohio. While at Inverness, Nelson coached and mentored the promising young player Frank Stranahan, who would go on to stardom over the next two decades.

Wins major championships
Nelson won his first major title at The Masters in 1937, two shots ahead of runner-up Ralph Guldahl. During this tournament he shot a first-round 66, which was the lowest first round score at the Masters until 1976, when Raymond Floyd had 65 en route to his victory. Nelson won four more majors, the U.S. Open in 1939, the PGA Championship in 1940 and 1945, and a second Masters in 1942.

World War II years
Nelson had a blood disorder that caused his blood to clot four times slower than normal, which kept him out of military service during World War II. It has sometimes mistakenly been reported that he had hemophilia; this is not true. During the war, Nelson gave hundreds of golf exhibitions across the country to raise money for charitable causes, often partnering with Harold "Jug" McSpaden, who was also exempt from military service.

Career highlights
In his career, Nelson won 52 professional events, and, along with McSpaden, was one of golf's "Gold Dust Twins".

Nelson won the Vardon Trophy in 1939. He played on two Ryder Cup teams, in 1937 and 1947, and was non-playing captain in 1965. After 1946, Nelson curtailed his schedule, although he continued to make regular appearances at The Masters as a competitor, played occasional Tour events, appeared in a few overseas tournaments, and later served as a ceremonial starter for many years.

Record-breaking year
In 1945, Nelson enjoyed a record-breaking year, winning 18 PGA tournaments out of the 30 he played, including 11 in a row that he played in. Both records are yet to be beaten. Nelson's run of 11 wins started in March with the Miami International Four-Ball, where he partnered Jug McSpaden. He then won 10 individual events ending with the Canadian Open in August, a run that finished when he finished tied for fourth place in the Memphis Invitational. During this run he won the 1945 PGA Championship, the only major championship played that year. The week after the PGA Championship he missed the St. Paul Open with a back injury. There has been debate as to how impressive these results are, as it was believed to be a weakened tour due to the war. But in reality many of the leading golfers of that time, including Sam Snead and Ben Hogan still played a full or at least part schedule that year. Snead won 6 times in 1945 while Hogan won 5 times in the latter part of the year. During this year Nelson finished second another 7 times, set a record for the scoring average (68.33 for 18 holes) that was broken by Tiger Woods in 2000, a record 18 hole score (62), and a record 72-hole score (259, which beat the previous record set by  Ben Hogan earlier that year). This year is now known as the greatest single year by a player on the PGA Tour, as Arnold Palmer said: "I don't think that anyone will ever exceed the things that Byron did by winning 11 tournaments in a row in one year." Even more recently, Tiger Woods referred to the year as "one of the great years in the history of the sport".

Cut streak
Nelson's record of 113 consecutive cuts made is second only to Tiger Woods' 142. The PGA Tour defines a "cut" as receiving a paycheck, even if an event has no cut per se. In Nelson's era, only the top 20 in a tournament received a check. In reality, Nelson's "113 consecutive cuts made" are representative of his unequaled 113 consecutive top 20 tournament finishes. Almost half of those top 20s were during the weakened tour war years of 1944 & 1945. In fact, 26 of Nelson's 52 tour wins were during those two weakened tour years of 1944 & 1945. Before 1944 he had never won more than 4 events in any year.

First to win 50 PGA Tour events
With his win at the 1946 Columbus Invitational, Nelson became the first player to reach 50 career PGA Tour wins. This feat has since been matched by Ben Hogan, Sam Snead, Arnold Palmer, Jack Nicklaus, Billy Casper, and Tiger Woods.

Notable performances
Nelson achieved several notable performances of scoring and accuracy at key moments in major championships:
 1937 Masters: Nelson scored a birdie and an eagle on holes 12 and 13 in the final round, making up six strokes on his main rival Ralph Guldahl, who played those same holes with a double bogey and a bogey; Nelson went on to win.
 1939 U.S. Open: Nelson hit the flagstick six times on approach shots during the regulation 72 holes and the 36 playoff holes, he won the championship.
 1945 PGA Championship: In the semi-final 36-hole match against Jim Turnesa, Nelson was down four holes with five holes remaining. He played those finishing holes with an eagle and four birdies to win the match; Turnesa scored a birdie and four pars over those holes; Nelson won the title the next day.

Retirement
Nelson retired officially at the relatively early age of 34 to become a rancher, buying a ranch at Roanoke, Texas.

Nelson later became a television golf commentator, during the 1960s and 1970s.

Byron Nelson Classic
From 1968, Nelson lent both his name and support to the Byron Nelson Golf Classic in Dallas; this was the first regularly-held PGA Tour event to be named for a professional golfer; the tournament had been previously staged as the Dallas Open.

Late-career competition, wins
As a former Masters champion, he continued to play in that annual tournament, placing in the top-10 six times between 1947 and 1955, and as high as 15th in 1965, at age 53. From 1947 to 1955 Nelson played in 12 majors and won none.

Nelson did win the 1951 Bing Crosby Pro-Am, a PGA Tour event which he had not won before. He also won the 1955 French Open. Nelson gave paid golf exhibitions for many years after he retired from the Tour, notably after his 1951 Crosby victory.

Writes memoirs
Nelson published his memoirs "How I Played The Game" in 1993 (by Taylor Publishing, Dallas).

Over nearly 70 years in the sport, Nelson played with many celebrities and well-known personalities, including: Roone Arledge, Bing Crosby, James Garner, Bob Hope, Bobby Knight, Randolph Scott, Ed Sullivan, Johnny Weissmuller, Lawrence Welk, and Babe Zaharias.

Coach and mentor
Among the rising golf talents Nelson coached and mentored, from the 1950s to the 1970s, are World Golf Hall of Fame members Ken Venturi and Tom Watson, along with Marty Fleckman (who won the 1965 NCAA title and one PGA Tour event), and the dominant amateur Harvie Ward.

Death and legacy
Nelson died Tuesday, September 26, 2006. According to a family friend, Nelson died at his Roanoke, Texas home around noon. He was survived by Peggy, his wife of nearly 20 years, sister Margaret Ellen Sherman (1920-2007), and brother Charles (1926-2018), a professor emeritus at Abilene Christian University, where Byron Nelson had been a trustee and benefactor. Nelson met his second wife, the former Peggy Simmons, when she volunteered at the Bogie Busters celebrity golf tournament in Dayton, Ohio in 1985.

Nelson was often referred to as "Lord Byron", after the English poet by that name, in recognition of his reputation for gentlemanly conduct, a nickname given him by Atlanta sports journalist O. B. Keeler. Many of his obituaries referenced this reputation.

Nelson had several successful years as a television golf commentator. Among the memorable events he broadcast was the 1966 U.S. Open for ABC Sports. Nelson's comments as Arnold Palmer let slip a big lead to Billy Casper on the final nine holes: "A few holes ago, everybody thought this championship was over. Golf is the strangest game in the world." It was at the 1974 U.S. Open that Nelson met Watson for the first time, and the two connected, after Watson let a big lead get away in the final round.

Nelson was ranked as the fifth greatest golfer of all time by Golf Digest magazine in 2000. On this list, Jack Nicklaus was first, Nelson's longtime rivals Ben Hogan and Sam Snead were second and third respectively, and Bobby Jones was fourth. A 2009 Sports Illustrated panel ranked him seventh on its list of all-time greatest golfers, behind Nicklaus, Tiger Woods, Jones, Hogan, Snead, and Arnold Palmer.

The "Iron Byron" electro-mechanical machine or robot, developed by Battelle Memorial Institute and True Temper Sports and used by the United States Golf Association and golf manufacturers to compare and test clubs and balls for conformity to standards, was named for Nelson, honoring the consistency of his swing.

In Jack Nicklaus's 1978 book On and Off the Fairway, Nicklaus wrote that Nelson was the straightest golfer he ever saw. The two never played competitively (except at the Masters; Nicklaus won in 1965, Nelson finished tied for 15th), but a 14-year-old Nicklaus was in the crowd at the 1954 U.S. Junior Amateur, when Nelson gave an exhibition hitting golf shots.

Posthumous honors
State Highway 114 Business through Roanoke, Texas is named Byron Nelson Boulevard, in honor of Nelson's residence; the street he lived on was recently changed to Eleven Straight Lane in honor of his 1945 record. In Irving, Texas a street immediately adjacent to the Four Seasons Resort and Club, where the HP Byron Nelson Championship is played each year, is named Byron Nelson Lane.  A street in Southlake, Texas, Byron Nelson Parkway, was named in his honor, as was a street in a residential neighborhood in McAllen, Texas.

On September 29, 2006, the United States Senate approved Senate Resolution 602 awarding Byron Nelson the Congressional Gold Medal, the highest award bestowed by the Legislative Branch of the United States government. The resolution cites Mr. Nelson's "significant contributions to the game of golf as a player, a teacher, and a commentator". Representative Michael C. Burgess (R-TX) sponsored the resolution, originally proposed March 8, 2006, well before Nelson's death. On June 27, 2007, Peggy Nelson, Byron Nelson's surviving wife, was presented with the medal.

On April 23, 2007, the Northwest Independent School District named their second high school Byron Nelson High School. This is the first high school named in honor of Byron Nelson, and opened in the fall of 2009. The school is located in Trophy Club, Texas, near Nelson's hometown of Roanoke.

Artist Chelle Adams painted two portraits of Byron Nelson in dedication which hang in the school's auditorium. Orange County Choppers built three choppers in dedication which were auctioned off.

Professional wins (64)

PGA Tour wins (52)

PGA Tour playoff record (6–4)

Source:

Other wins (12)
(This list may be incomplete)
1937 Central Pennsylvania Open
1939 Massachusetts Open
1940 Ohio Open
1941 Ohio Open, Seminole Pro-Am
1942 Toledo Open, Ohio Open
1943 Kentucky Open
1944 New York Open, Beverly Hills Open
1948 Texas PGA Championship
1955 French Open

Major championships

Wins (5)

Note: The PGA Championship was match play until 1958 
1 Defeated Craig Wood and Denny Shute in a 36-hole playoff - Nelson (68-70=138), Wood (68-73=141), Shute (76) (eliminated after first 18)
2 Defeated Ben Hogan in an 18-hole playoff - Nelson 69 (−3), Hogan 70 (−2)

Results timeline

NT = no tournament
WD = withdrew
CUT = missed the half-way cut
R64, R32, R16, QF, SF = Round in which player lost in PGA Championship match play
"T" indicates a tie for a place

Summary

Most consecutive cuts made – 26 (1937 Masters – 1949 Masters)
Longest streak of top-10s – 12 (1937 Open Championship – 1941 Masters)

Awards
Vardon Trophy: 1939
PGA Tour leading money winner: 1944, 1945
Associated Press Male Athlete of the Year: 1944, 1945
Bob Jones Award: 1974
World Golf Hall of Fame: 1974
Old Tom Morris Award: 1994
PGA Tour Lifetime Achievement Award: 1997
Payne Stewart Award: 2000
Congressional Gold Medal: 2006

See also

Byron Nelson Award
List of golfers with most PGA Tour wins
List of longest PGA Tour win streaks
List of men's major championships winning golfers
Most PGA Tour wins in a year

References

External links

Memorial Page for Byron Nelson, Hilltop Church of Christ, Roanoke, Texas (includes biographical sketch, quotations, photographs, and links to obituaries)
Byron Nelson's Congressional Medal
Tribute to Byron Nelson
HP Byron Nelson Championship Web site - golf tournament named after Byron Nelson
HP Byron Nelson Championship Media Guide - contains biographical information

American male golfers
PGA Tour golfers
Ryder Cup competitors for the United States
Winners of men's major golf championships
World Golf Hall of Fame inductees
Congressional Gold Medal recipients
Golf writers and broadcasters
Golfers from Texas
20th-century American memoirists
Abilene Christian University people
American members of the Churches of Christ
People from Waxahachie, Texas
People from Roanoke, Texas
1912 births
2006 deaths